Murphy is a common Irish surname.

Murphy may also refer to:

Places

United States
 Murphy, Idaho, an unincorporated village
 Murphy, Missouri, a census-designated place 
 Murphy, North Carolina, a town
 Murphy, Texas, a city
 Murphy, Virginia, an unincorporated community
 Murphy, West Virginia, an unincorporated community

Argentina
 Murphy, Santa Fe, a town

Businesses
 Murphy Aircraft, a Canadian company
 Murphy Oil, an American petroleum and natural gas exploration company
 Murphy Radio, a defunct British manufacturer of home radio sets

Given name
 Murphy (given name), a list of people and fictional characters

Other uses
 Murphy (novel), a 1938 novel by Samuel Beckett
 Murphy (novella), a 1987 novella by Gary Paulsen
 USS Murphy (DD-603), a Benson-class destroyer
 Murphy Oil Soap, a cleaning product
 Murphy High School (Mobile, Alabama), a high school in Mobile, Alabama, U.S.
 Murphy High School (North Carolina)

See also
 Camp Murphy (disambiguation)
 Murph (disambiguation)
 Murphys (disambiguation)
 Murphy's crow
 Murphy's law
 Robert Cushman Murphy Junior High School, a junior high school in Stony Brook, New York, U.S.
 Murphy's Irish Stout, a dark beer brewed in Cork, Ireland